Viajar was a television channel from Spain specializing in travel and tourism themes. It was broadcast via the Canal+ satellite platform and by cable providers. It was acquired by Fox in October 2011.

References

External links
Official site 

Television stations in Spain
Defunct television channels in Spain
Television channels and stations established in 1997
Television channels and stations disestablished in 2021
1997 establishments in Spain
2021 disestablishments in Spain
Spanish-language television stations
Mass media in Madrid
Disney television networks